Michael William O'Callaghan (born 27 April 1946) is a former New Zealand rugby union player. He played three Test matches for the All Blacks against the touring French team that year.

After studying veterinary medicine at Massey University, O'Callaghan completed a master's degree at the National Veterinary School of Toulouse in France, where he played first for Stade Poitevin and then Stade Toulousain. He then undertook doctoral studies at the University of Cambridge; the title of his thesis, completed in 1978, was Assessment of sino-atrial and atrio-ventricular nodal function in the conscious horse by intra-atrial electrostimulation. While at Cambridge, he was awarded blues for rugby every year from 1974 to 1977. O'Callaghan then returned to Massey where he was on the faculty of the School of Veterinary Medicine, before moving to Tufts University School of Veterinary Medicine for 10 years, including three years as head of department. He then spent 15 years at Genzyme in Massachusetts as a research and development executive leader, before joining Audentes Therapeutics as senior vice president, preclinical development and translational medicine.

Personal life 
O'Callaghan married New Zealand scholar of French culture, Raylene Ramsay, in Poitiers in 1971.

References

1946 births
Living people
People from Rotherham, New Zealand
People educated at Christchurch Boys' High School
New Zealand rugby union players
New Zealand international rugby union players
Manawatu rugby union players
Waikato rugby union players
Stade Toulousain players
Cambridge University R.U.F.C. players
Rugby union wings
Lincoln University (New Zealand) alumni
Massey University alumni
University of Toulouse alumni
Alumni of the University of Cambridge
Veterinary scientists
Academic staff of the Massey University
Tufts University faculty
Rugby union players from Canterbury, New Zealand
Barbarian F.C. players